Elbow witches are old women with awls in their elbows in the Ojibwa story of Aayaase (also known as "Aayaash" or "Iyash"), "Filcher-of-Meat". Blinded by cooking smoke, the sisters killed each other in their attempts to kill him for their meal.

In popular culture
Elbow Witch is Monster in My Pocket #63, one of only three monsters derived from Native American mythology, the others being Wendigo and (to an extent) Bigfoot.  The character's awls look very much like tusks.

References

External links
The Story of Iyash
"Old Sisters" in The Legend of Iyash on K-Net.
archive of "Elbow Witch", on Scott Andrew Hutchins's Monster in my Pocket page

Anishinaabe mythology
Witchcraft in folklore and mythology